The 2019 Bretagne World RX of France was the eighth round of the sixth season of the FIA World Rallycross Championship. The event was held at the Circuit de Lohéac in the Lohéac commune of Bretagne.

Supercar 

Source

Heats

Semi-finals 

 Semi-Final 1

 Semi-Final 2

Final

Standings after the event 

Source

 Note: Only the top six positions are included.

References 

|- style="text-align:center"
|width="35%"|Previous race:2019 World RX of Canada
|width="40%"|FIA World Rallycross Championship2019 season
|width="35%"|Next race:2019 World RX of Latvia
|- style="text-align:center"
|width="35%"|Previous race:2018 World RX of France
|width="40%"|World RX of France
|width="35%"|Next race:2021 World RX of France
|- style="text-align:center"

France
World RX
World RX